Elizabeth Robinson (born 1961, Denver, Colorado) is an American poet and professor, author of twelve collections of poetry, most recently Counterpart (Ahsahta Press, 2012), "Three Novels" (Omnidawn, 2011) "Also Known A," (Apogee, 2009), and The Orphan and Its Relations (Fence Books, 2008). Her work has appeared in Conjunctions, The Iowa Review, Colorado Review, the Denver Quarterly, Poetry Salzburg Review, and New American Writing. Her poems have been anthologized in "American Hybrid" (Norton, 2009), "The Best of Fence" (Fence, 2009), and Postmodern American Poetry (Norton, 2013)  With Avery Burns, Joseph Noble, Rusty Morrison, and Brian Strang, she co-edited 26 magazine.  Starting in 2012, Robinson began editing a new literary periodical, Pallaksch. Pallaksch, with Steven Seidenberg.  For 12 years, Robinson co-edited, with Colleen Lookingbill, the EtherDome Chapbook series which published chapbooks by emerging women poets.  She co-edits Instance Press with Beth Anderson and Laura Sims. She graduated from Bard College, Brown University, and Pacific School of Religion. She moved from the Bay Area to Boulder, Colorado where she taught at the University of Colorado and at Naropa University.  She has also taught at the Iowa Writers' Workshop and has twice served as the Hugo Fellow at the University of Montana.

Early life
Robinson was born in Denver, Colorado but grew up primarily in Southern California with four siblings.  She began writing poetry soon after she became literate.  Robinson spent her first  in college at the University of California, Davis, where she took courses from Karl Shapiro.  After a year at Davis, she transferred to Bard College in Annandale-on-Hudson, where she worked extensively with Robert Kelly, but also studied with Edward Sanders and Robert Duncan.  During the summer of 1984, she went to the summer writing program at (then) Naropa Institute where she had her first contact with Robert Creeley, another important mentor.  At Brown University, where Robinson completed an MFA, she worked with Keith Waldrop (and was an intern with Burning Deck Press) and C.D. Wright.

Awards
2017 Fellow at the Bridwell Library, Perkins School of Theology, Southern Methodist University
2016 Fellow at the Maison Dora Maar, Menerbes, France
2012 Grant from the Boomerang Foundation
 2008 Foundation for Contemporary Arts, Grants to Artists Award
 2002 Fence Modern Poets Prize for Apprehend
 2001 National Poetry Series for Pure Descent
Winner of Gertrude Stein Awards for Innovative Poetry, 1994, 1995, 2006
1987 Baxter Hathaway Prize for a long poem, Epoch Magazine
Recipient of residencies at the MacDowell Colony, the Djerassi Resident Artists Program, and the Headlands Center for the Arts

Published works
Full-length Collections
"Blue Heron," (Fort Collins CO, Center for Literary Publishing, 2013)
 Counterpart (Boise ID: Ahsahta Press, 2012)
"Three Novels" (Omnidawn, 2011)
 "Also Known As" (Apogee Press, 2009)
 Inaudible Trumpeters (Harbor Mountain Press, 2008)
 
 
 
 
 
 
 
 
 

Chapbooks
"Reply" (Pavement Saw Press, 2011)
"Rumor" (Belladonna Press, 2008)
"The Golem" (Phylum Press, 2007)
 Carrington (Hot Whiskey Press, 2008)
 My Name Happens Also (Burning Deck Press, 1987)

References

External links
 Interview: Here Comes Everybody > Writers on Writing > April 19, 2005 > Interview with Elizabeth Robinson
 Interview: Poetry Society of America > Crossroads > Q & A: American Poetry > Interview with Elizabeth Robinson
  Audio: Poets Co-op Podcasts > Audio Archives > Multiple Readings of Poems by Elizabeth Robinson
 Poems: The Brooklyn Rail > September 2007 > Three Poems by Elizabeth Robinson
 Poem: Woodland Pattern Book Center > Poetry Archive > "Quench" by Elizabeth Robinson
 Poem: Literary Salt > Issue 3 > "Moonlight" by Elizabeth Robinson

1961 births
Living people
Bard College alumni
Brown University alumni
University of Colorado faculty
Writers from Denver
American women poets
Chapbook writers
21st-century American poets
American women academics
21st-century American women writers